Hagit Attiya is an Israeli computer scientist who holds the Harry W. Labov and Charlotte Ullman Labov Academic Chair of Computer Science at the Technion – Israel Institute of Technology in Haifa, Israel. Her research is in the area of distributed computing.

Education and career
Attiya was educated at the Hebrew University of Jerusalem, earning a B.S. in mathematics and computer science in 1981, a master's degree from the same university in 1983, and a doctorate in 1987, under the supervision of Danny Dolev. After postdoctoral studies at the Massachusetts Institute of Technology, she joined the Technion faculty in 1990.

She has been the editor-in-chief of the journal Distributed Computing since 2008.

Awards and honors
Attiya became a fellow of the Association for Computing Machinery in 2009 for "contributions to distributed and parallel computing".

In 2011, Attiya and her co-authors Danny Dolev and Amotz Bar-Noy won the Edsger W. Dijkstra Prize in Distributed Computing for their work on implementing shared memory using message passing, published in the Journal of the ACM in 1995. She was also the recipient of the Michael Bruno Memorial Award from Yad Hanadiv in 2011.

Selected publications

Research papers

Books

References

External links
Home page

Year of birth missing (living people)
Living people
Israeli computer scientists
Israeli women computer scientists
Researchers in distributed computing
Hebrew University of Jerusalem alumni
Academic staff of Technion – Israel Institute of Technology
Fellows of the Association for Computing Machinery
Place of birth missing (living people)